Schreckensteiner was a Bohemian wine known for its quality.It was grown at the foot of the ruined Schreckenstein Castle on south facing slopes on the right bank of the River Elbe near the Bohemian village of Aussig which is now Ústí nad Labem in the Czech Republic. 

It may have given its name to the additional staking pot in the game of German Tarok which was known in Bohemia.

References

Literature 
 _ (1889). Tarok (Sans prendre). Munich: Grau.
 Schnabel, Dr. G. R. (1846). Statistik der landwirthschaftlichen Industrie von Böhmen ["Statistics for the Agricultural Industry of Bohemia"]. Prague: J.G Calve.

German wine
Czech wine